Lordship Lane may refer to:

In London:
Lordship Lane, Haringey, north London
Lordship Lane, Southwark, south London
The disused Lordship Lane railway station

Elsewhere:
Lordship Lane, a street in Cottenham, Cambridgeshire
Lordship Lane, a street in Frodsham and Helsby, Cheshire
Lordship Lane, a street in Letchworth and Norton, Hertfordshire
Lordship Lane, a street in Orston, Nottinghamshire
Lordship Lane, a street in Selby and Wistow, North Yorkshire
Lordship Lane, a footpath in Stoke-on-Trent, Staffordshire